"Lifetime" is a song by Swedish house music supergroup Swedish House Mafia, featuring vocals from American singer Ty Dolla Sign and American rapper 070 Shake. It was released on 19 July 2021 as the second single from the group's debut studio album Paradise Again, via Republic Records.

Music video
The music video was directed by Alexander Wessely. It depicts the trio as they awake and walk through a vast desert before stumbling across a strange monolith that appears to lead to another world.

Live performance
On 19 July 2021, Swedish House Mafia performed "Lifetime" on The Tonight Show Starring Jimmy Fallon.

Charts

Weekly charts

Year-end charts

Release history

References

2021 songs
2021 singles
Swedish House Mafia songs
070 Shake songs
Songs written by 070 Shake
Songs written by Axwell
Songs written by Vincent Pontare
Songs written by ASAP Rocky
Songs written by Sebastian Ingrosso
Songs written by Steve Angello
Songs written by Ty Dolla Sign
Ty Dolla Sign songs
Republic Records singles
Universal Music Group singles